Selective relaxant binding agents (SRBAs) are a new class of drugs that selectively encapsulates and binds neuromuscular blocking agents (NMBAs). The first drug introduction of an SRBA is sugammadex. Sugammadex is a modified gamma cyclodextrin that specifically encapsulates and binds the aminosteroid NMBAs: rocuronium>vecuronium>>pancuronium. SRBAs exert a chelating action that effectively terminates an NMBA ability to bind to nicotinic receptors.

Discovery of SRBAs
The discovery of SRBA as a new class of drug is the result of work done by Organon laboratories at the Newhouse research site in Scotland. Cyclodextrins were explored as a means to solubilize rocuronium bromide (a steroidal NMBA) in a neutral aqueous solution. Upon creating numerous modified cyclodextrins, one particular molecule was found to possess extremely high affinity for the rocuronium molecule. Originally known as Org25969, it is now generically named sugammadex sodium.

References

Anesthesia
Antidotes
Polysaccharides